Milan Vasić (born September 2, 1980, in Belgrade, SR Serbia, Yugoslavia) is a Serbian volleyball player. He started playing volleyball in OK Crvena Zvezda. He played 43 games for the national team. He was a member of the national team representing Serbia and Montenegro at the 2004 Summer Olympics in Athens.

Career 
 1998-03   OK Crvena Zvezda
 2003-04   Fenerbahçe
 2004-05   CV Almería
 2005-06   Oristada
 2006-07   played in Japan
 2007-08   Berlin
 2008-09   Metalurg
 2009-10   ASSECO Resovia Rzeszów
 2010-11   played in Iran
 2011-12   played in Turkey
 2012–13   LUC Volleyball
 2013–14   Dinamo București

External links
 Milan Vasić – Sports-Reference.com
 Milan Vasić – FIVB
 Milan Vasić at Volleyball Forever
 Milan Vasić at Scoresway.com

1980 births
Living people
Sportspeople from Belgrade
Serbian men's volleyball players
Serbia and Montenegro men's volleyball players
Olympic volleyball players of Serbia and Montenegro
Volleyball players at the 2004 Summer Olympics
Mediterranean Games medalists in volleyball
Mediterranean Games bronze medalists for Serbia
Competitors at the 2005 Mediterranean Games
Serbian expatriate sportspeople in Italy
Serbian expatriate sportspeople in Spain
Serbian expatriate sportspeople in Greece
Serbian expatriate sportspeople in Japan
Serbian expatriate sportspeople in Germany
Serbian expatriate sportspeople in Bulgaria
Serbian expatriate sportspeople in Poland
Serbian expatriate sportspeople in Iran
Serbian expatriate sportspeople in Turkey
Serbian expatriate sportspeople in Switzerland
Serbian expatriate sportspeople in Romania